The PMPV MiSu is a Finnish made six-wheeled amphibious mine-resistant ambush protected armoured personnel carrier (APC) designed for the Finnish Defence Forces as a possible replacement for its XA-180-series vehicles. The first version was produced in 2015 and test production began in 2017. It was designed to operate with ease of use, simple structure and low-cost maintenance. The basic appearance and configuration of PMPV Misu is similar to most wheeled MRAPs. The Misu is fully amphibious.

Development
In 2009 Protolab Oy began planning a prototype vehicle intended as a replacement for the XA-180 vehicles used by the Finnish Army. In 2015 the first vehicle was sent out for field testing. After additional funding was received as an offset from the NASAMS deal, four vehicles are to be built. Two of these will be sent to the UK for testing the vehicle's functions against explosives. The fourth test vehicle will be the first production vehicle. In December 2017 the Finnish Defense Forces ordered 4 production vehicles.

The vehicle's nickname "MiSu" is derived from the Finnish name "MiinaSuojattu" and "PMPV" stands for "Protected Multi-Purpose Vehicle". The main superstructure is mainly manufactured from 6 to 12 mm of armour steel enhanced with Exote liner and the bottom is mine strengthened, the front windows are bullet-resistant. The vehicle has continuous six wheel drive and good capabilities for off-road driving. It can take inclines up to a maximum of 60%.

Operators
: Finnish Army

See also
Patria Pasi variants
Patria 6x6, the competing offer by  Patria to succeed the aforementioned Pasi
Patria AMV
List of AFVs

References

External links

Wheeled armoured personnel carriers
Post–Cold War military vehicles of Finland
Vehicles introduced in 2015
Six-wheeled vehicles
Wheeled amphibious armoured fighting vehicles
Military vehicles introduced in the 2010s
Amphibious armoured personnel carriers
Armoured personnel carriers of Finland